Steve Fox is an American football coach. He served as the head football coach at McPherson College in McPherson, Kansas for one season, in 2014. He replaced Pete Sterbick, who resigned after the end of the 2013 season.

Prior to his promotion to head coach at McPherson, Fox was an assistant coach and the defensive coordinator for the Bulldogs. He also worked as an assistant coach at Oklahoma Panhandle State University, Howard Payne University, West Texas A&M University, Tabor College, and Abilene Christian University.

After completing one season with a record of 4–7, Fox resigned to take a position as assistant coach at Cisco College.

Head coaching record

References

External links
 McPherson profile

Year of birth missing (living people)
Living people
Abilene Christian Wildcats football coaches
Cisco Wranglers football coaches
Howard Payne Yellow Jackets football coaches
McPherson Bulldogs football coaches
Oklahoma Panhandle State Aggies football coaches
Tabor Bluejays football coaches
West Texas A&M Buffaloes football coaches